Owen George Anthony Silvera (born c.1956), better known as Ambelique, is a Jamaican reggae singer, primarily working in the lovers rock genre.

Biography
Born in Waltham Park, Kingston, Jamaica, Silvera began his career in the late 1960s, when he worked with Derrick Harriott's 'Musical Chariot' sound system as a deejay under the name Ramon the Mexican, also recording with Harriott's band The Crystallites on the album The Undertaker.

He relocated to The Bronx, New York City and joined Hugh Hendricks and the Buccaneers with whom he toured the United States. He continued to perform but supported himself working as a bank clerk in California. He resumed his music career in 1989 and began a working relationship with Sly & Robbie, with whom he recorded a string of singles, achieving commercial success in the 1990s and beyond.

In 2011, he contributed to the single "We'll Always Be There", in aid of the charity Food For The Poor, along with artist such as J.C. Lodge, Dobby Dobson, Glen Washington, Hopeton Lindo, Sharon Forrester, Barry Biggs, and The Melodians.

Discography
Sings the Classics (1997), VP
Love's Got a Hold on Me (2000), Charm
Shower Me with Love (2002), Angella
Special Attention (2003), Charm
Missing You (2003), Jet Star
Sharing the Night (2008), Cousins

References

1950s births
Living people
Musicians from Kingston, Jamaica
Jamaican reggae musicians
20th-century Jamaican male singers
Lovers rock musicians
Jamaican emigrants to the United States
21st-century Jamaican male singers
VP Records artists